Siebe Van der Heyden (born 30 May 1998) is a Belgian footballer who plays as a  centre back for Union SG and the Belgium national team.

Club career
He made his Belgian First Division A debut for Oostende on 21 May 2017 in a game against Anderlecht, as an 88th-minute substitute for David Rozehnal.

On 30 July 2018, he moved to the Netherlands, signing with FC Eindhoven for one year with an option to extend the contract for one more year.

International career
On 18 March 2022 he was named in the senior Belgium squad for the two friendly matches on 26 and 29 March 2022 against Republic of Ireland and Burkina Faso respectively. He made his debut against Burkina Faso, playing the full match in a 3—0 win.

Career statistics

Club

Honours
K.V. Oostende
Belgian Cup Runner-up: 2016-17

Union SG
Challenger Pro League: 2020-21
Belgian First Division A Runner-up: 2021-22

References

External links
 

1998 births
People from Denderleeuw
Living people
Belgian footballers
Belgium international footballers
Association football defenders
K.V. Oostende players
FC Eindhoven players
Royale Union Saint-Gilloise players
Belgian Pro League players
Challenger Pro League players
Eerste Divisie players
Belgian expatriate footballers
Expatriate footballers in the Netherlands
Footballers from East Flanders